Bhama Ramkhelawon is an assistant professor in the Department of Surgery at NYU Grossman School of Medicine, as well as assistant professor in the Department of Cell Biology and director of vascular surgery scientific research. Her lab focuses its research efforts “on deciphering the molecular and cellular mechanisms that underlie the development of aortic aneurysms (AA).”

Originally from Mauritius, she received her PhD from the Paris Diderot University, Paris, France, in 2010.

Awards and recognition
In 2014, L'Oreal awarded her a fellowship to do research at NYU on diabetes and obesity, and in 2015 named her L’Oréal-UNESCO For Women in Science International Rising Talent “for her project on how hypoxia sustains low-grade inflammation by inducing netrin-1 expression in adipose tissue resident macrophages in obesity.“

In 2019, she received the Springer Junior Investigator Award of the North American Vascular Biology Organization.

Also in 2019, she was named a Young Leader by the French American Foundation.

Publications

References

New York University Grossman School of Medicine faculty
Paris Diderot University alumni
Living people
Year of birth missing (living people)
Mauritian surgeons